Abass Muyiwa Lawal (born 13 September 1980) is a Nigerian footballer who played mainly as a right winger.

He spent nearly one full decade in Spain, amassing league totals of 127 games and 14 goals for six clubs (only six matches in La Liga). He also competed professionally in the United Arab Emirates.

Football career
Born in Ibadan, Lawal moved to Spain at only 17 and signed with Atlético Madrid, going on to spend three full seasons with the B-team in Segunda División. In 2000–01 he was promoted to the main squad which was also competing in that category, appearing rarely (178 minutes) as the Colchoneros failed to regain their La Liga status.

After two solid seasons in the second level, with Córdoba CF and CD Leganés, Lawal returned to the top division with Albacete Balompié, but failed to establish himself in the Castile-La Mancha side and left for Xerez CD in January 2005; Albacete would also be relegated at the end of his second season.

Subsequently, Lawal played a few years in Morocco and the United Arab Emirates, where he dealt with several injury problems. In December 2013, after nearly four years of inactivity, he returned to Nigeria and joined Sunshine Stars FC.

Personal life
Lawal's middle name, Muyiwa, means "God has brought this".
His older brother, Oladimeji, was also a footballer. A midfielder, he had professional stints in Spain and Belgium.

References

External links
 
 Stats at Voetbal International 
 
 

1980 births
Living people
Sportspeople from Ibadan
Nigerian footballers
Yoruba sportspeople
Association football wingers
Nigeria Professional Football League players
Plateau United F.C. players
Sunshine Stars F.C. players
La Liga players
Segunda División players
Atlético Madrid B players
Atlético Madrid footballers
Córdoba CF players
CD Leganés players
Albacete Balompié players
Xerez CD footballers
Moghreb Tétouan players
UAE First Division League players
UAE Pro League players
Emirates Club players
Ras Al Khaimah Club players
Khor Fakkan Sports Club players
Al Dhafra FC players
Nigerian expatriate footballers
Expatriate footballers in Spain
Expatriate footballers in Morocco
Expatriate footballers in the United Arab Emirates
Nigerian expatriate sportspeople in Spain
Nigerian expatriate sportspeople in the United Arab Emirates